= Town & Witherell =

American silversmith duo (fl. 1838–1845)

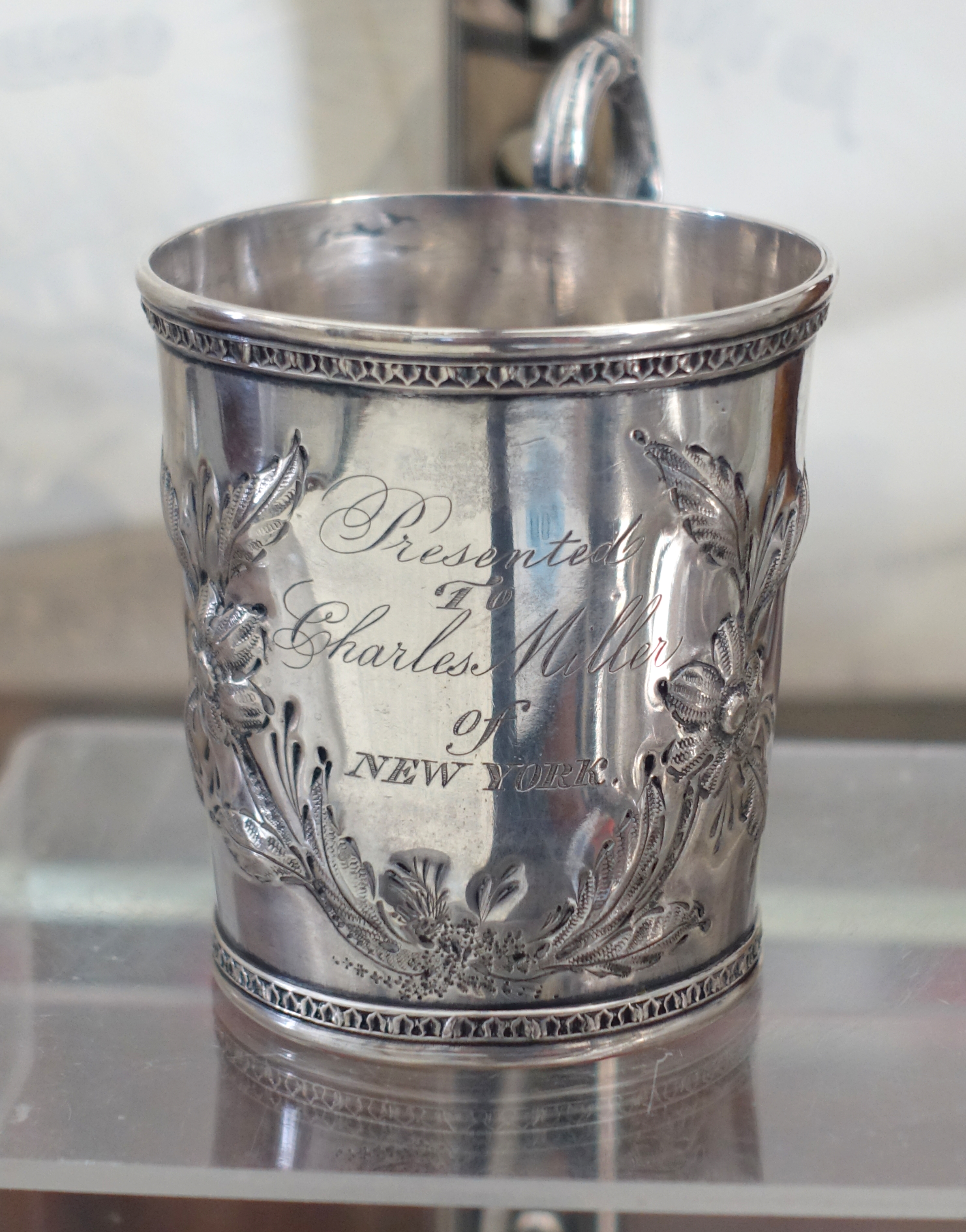
Presentation cup by Town and Witherell

Town & Witherell were two American silversmiths in Montpelier, Vermont, who collaborated between 1838 and 1845.

Ira Strong Towne was born March 3, 1810, and died September 19, 1902. His apprentice Elijah Bailey Witherell was born March 15, 1817, and died before April 26, 1849).
